Dewmaine was an unincorporated African-American coal-mining community in Williamson County, Illinois. Today the area is almost completely non-residential and vacant land, though it now sits at the northern edge of Carterville. Its name is an amalgamation of Admiral Dewey and the USS Maine from the Spanish–American War.

A post office was established at Dewmaine in 1901, and remained in operation until 1931. It is now served by the Carterville post office. Estimated population in 1958 was 50.

References

Unincorporated communities in Williamson County, Illinois
Unincorporated communities in Illinois
Populated places established in 1901